Mashoor Shereef (born 5 January 1993), is an Indian professional footballer who plays as a defender for Indian Super League club NorthEast United.

Club career

Chennai City 
He made his professional debut for the Chennai City against Indian Arrows on 29 November 2017. He was brought in the 26th minute as Chennai City lost 3–0.

NorthEast United 
In 2020, Mashoor joined Indian Super League club NorthEast United. He made 11 appearances in 2020–21 Indian Super League season. He scored his first goal for NorthEast United on 21 December 2021 against ATK Mohun Bagan.

International career
On 2 March 2021, Shereef got selected for the 35-man-squad national camp ahead of India national team's friendlies against Oman and UAE. On 29 March 2021, Shereef made his international debut for India against UAE.

Career statistics

Club

International

References

1993 births
Living people
People from Malappuram
Chennai City FC players
Footballers from Kerala
I-League players
Indian footballers
Association football defenders
India international footballers
Indian Super League players
NorthEast United FC players